Ágnes Bánfai (8 June 1947 – 20 August 2020) was a Hungarian gymnast. She competed at the 1968 Summer Olympics in all artistic gymnastics events and finished in fifth place in the team competition. Her best individual result was tenth place on the balance beam. She won a bronze medal with the Hungarian team at the 1974 World Artistic Gymnastics Championships.

References

External links 
 

1947 births
2020 deaths
Gymnasts from Budapest
Hungarian female artistic gymnasts
Gymnasts at the 1968 Summer Olympics
Olympic gymnasts of Hungary
Medalists at the World Artistic Gymnastics Championships
20th-century Hungarian women
21st-century Hungarian women